Magomed Aliyevich Suleimanov (29 February 1976 – 11 August 2015), also known as Abu Usman Gimrinsky, was a Dagestani Islamist in Russia and the third leader of the Caucasus Emirate militant group.

Biography
An ethnic Avar from the Dagestani village of Gimry, Suleimanov studied at the Fatah al-Islami University in Damascus in 1992. In 2005, he returned to Dagestan and became the Qadi (judge) of the central mosque in Gimry. In 2006, Suleimanov joined Dagestan's armed insurgency, however in 2008 he surrendered to authorities and received an amnesty.

In 2009, Suleimanov rejoined the insurgency, where he would serve as both the Qadi of the Caucasus Emirate's Vilayat Dagestan branch, and the military commander of Vilayat Dagestan's Mountain Sector, which included his home village of Gimry.

In 2014, Rustam Asildarov and a number of other senior Caucasus Emirate commanders announced their defection to the Islamic State of Iraq and the Levant (ISIL), swearing an oath of allegiance to its leader, Abu Bakr al-Baghdadi. Both, Suleimanov and Caucasus Emirate leader, Aliaskhab Kebekov, condemned this as a betrayal.

Following the killing of Aliaskhab Kebekov by Russian security forces in April 2015, Suleimanov was chosen as the new leader of the Caucasus Emirate, however he was not formally announced until 2 July 2015.

Death
On 11 August 2015, Magomed Suleimanov was killed in special operations by Russian security forces during a raid near Gimry in Russia's republic of Dagestan.

References

1976 births
2015 deaths
Avar people
Emirs of the Caucasian Emirate
People shot dead by law enforcement officers in Russia
Leaders of Islamic terror groups
People from Dagestan